A shaft tomb or shaft grave is a type of deep rectangular burial structure, similar in shape to the much shallower cist grave, containing a floor of pebbles, walls of rubble masonry, and a roof constructed of wooden planks.

Practice
The practice of digging shaft tombs was a widespread phenomenon with prominent examples found in Mycenaean Greece; in Bronze Age China; and in Mesoamerican Western Mexico.

In the Neolithic period Epirus was populated by seafarers along the coast and by shepherds and hunters from the southwestern Balkans who brought with them the Proto-Greek language. These people buried their leaders in large mounds containing shaft graves. Similar burial chambers were subsequently used by the Mycenaean civilization, suggesting that the founders of Mycenae may have come from Epirus and central Albania. Epirus itself remained culturally backward during this time, but Mycenaean remains have been found at two religious shrines of great antiquity in the region: the Oracle of the Dead on the Acheron River, familiar to the heroes of Homer's Odyssey, and the Oracle of Zeus at Dodona, to whom Achilles prayed in the Iliad.

Mycenaean Greece
Mycenaean shaft graves originated and evolved from rudimentary Middle Helladic cists, tumuli, and tholos tombs with features derived from Early Bronze Age traditions developed locally in mainland Bronze Age Greece 16th century BCE. Middle Helladic burials would ultimately serve as the basis for the royal Shaft Graves containing a variety of grave goods, which signified the elevation of a native Greek-speaking royal dynasty whose economic power depended on long-distance sea trade.

The depth of Mycenaean shaft tombs would range from 1.0 m to 4.0 m with a mound constructed for each grave and stelae erected. Archaeological examples include Grave Circle A and Grave Circle B.

Bronze Age China
Shaft graves were utilized by elites from the Shang dynasty (or Yin dynasty) during the Bronze Age 1200 BCE of northern China.

Mesoamerican Western Mexico
The Western Mexico shaft tomb tradition or shaft tomb culture refers to a set of interlocked cultural traits found in the present day western Mexican states of Jalisco, Nayarit, and, to a lesser extent, Colima to its south, roughly dating to the period between 300 BCE and 400 CE. An example is the La Campana archaeological site of the Capacha and subsequent cultures.

See also
Grave Circle A, Mycenae
Grave Circle B, Mycenae
Grave field
Ixtlán del Rio (archaeological site)
Shaft and chamber tomb
Western Mexico shaft tomb tradition

References

Citations

Sources

External links

Burial monuments and structures
Bronze Age Europe